Putrajaya may refer to:
Putrajaya
Putrajaya (federal constituency), represented in the Dewan Rakyat

See also
Petra Jaya